Nordarnøya is an island in Gildeskål Municipality in Nordland county, Norway. The  island had 52 residents in 2017. It lies directly north of the island of Sørarnøya. There is a small fishing village on the west side of the island (also called Nordarnøya).

See also
List of islands of Norway

References

Gildeskål
Islands of Nordland